Luis G. Cortes (unknown – unknown) was a Spanish chess player, Catalan Chess Championship winner (1923).

Biography
In the 1920s Luis G. Cortes was one of the leading Spanish chess players. In 1923, he won Catalan Chess Championship.

Luis G. Cortes played for Spain in the Chess Olympiad:
 In 1928, at second board in the 2nd Chess Olympiad in The Hague (+1, =5, -10).

References

External links

Luis G. Cortes chess games at 365chess.com

Year of birth missing
Year of death missing
Spanish chess players
Chess Olympiad competitors